King Report can refer to:

King Report on Corporate Governance - three reports (King I, King II, King III) detailing the South African corporate governance code
The King Report - a daily financial commentary by William J. King